Onda Latina was an Italian music television channel, mainly devoted to Latin American music (usually just in Spanish): Salsa, Merengue, Bachata, Reggaeton and Latin pop. It started on 31 July 2009 as a spin-off of the premium radio channel of the same name. Until 2012, it was available on Sky Italia as a pay-television service. After a brief closure, in 2013 the channel started airing again exclusively on free terrestrial TV, on channel 162. On 28 December 2015, the channel closed down and was replaced by Onda Italiana, a TV-station with Italian music.

References

External links 
  

Television channels and stations established in 2009
Television channels and stations disestablished in 2015
2009 establishments in Italy
2015 disestablishments in Italy
Defunct television channels in Italy
Music television channels
GEDI Gruppo Editoriale
Italian-language television stations
Music organisations based in Italy